Saint Marie is a fictional island in the Lesser Antilles which serves as the setting for the BBC crime drama television series Death in Paradise.

Premise
It is described in Episode 4.5 as being  from Martinique.

The island is a British Overseas Territory, but was handed over to the British from the French only in the 1970s. As a result, about 30% of its people are French citizens, with the French language still widely spoken.

The back story appears to be a blend of two real-world islands near Guadeloupe, with size and location aligning with Marie-Galante (in real-life politically affiliated with Guadeloupe, not independent of it), and history and language aligning with Dominica.

In episode 4.5, it is mentioned that Martinique is "a good 70 miles." In Episode 5.2 a map can be seen with Puerto Rico in the northwest and Dominica in the southeast of the map, Saint Marie, in addition to another fictional island, Saint Robert, are present on the map, it would appear that there is significantly more distance between Guadelope and Dominica in the Death in Paradise universe, Saint Robert appears similar in shape, and slightly smaller in size than Dominica, although rotated by about 100-110 degrees anti-clockwise; although inconsistent with other in-universe statements Saint Marie appears about the same size as Dominica, and much larger than Marie-Galante. Marie-Galante, Saint-Marie, Spinner's Rock (a small islet relevant to this episode), and Saint Robert can be described as being on a straight line between Guadelope and Dominica in that order from the most northern to the most southern. Both Marie-Galante and Dominica are present, thus ruling out the possibilities of these two as candidates for Saint-Marie.

The island drives on the right hand side of the road, and vehicles, including the police Land Rover Defender 110, have number plates in the same format as France, and are left-hand drive.

Features
Saint Marie's population is assumed to be around 10,000. However, in series 10, episode 1, an audience figure of 85,000 is quoted for a programme on the Saint Marie Broadcasting Corporation (although this may include viewers outside of the island).

In the series, Saint Marie has a volcano, rainforest, sugar and coffee plantations, a fishing harbour, an airport, a university, a convent, multiple hotels, approximately one hundred public beaches, and a Crown Court. It also has its own newspaper, The Saint Marie Times. Honoré, the main town, has a leisure/commercial marina, market, bars, and restaurants as well as the police station. The neighbouring town to Honoré is named as Port Royal. Its main economic ties are to Guadeloupe, the UK, and France, but it uses the East Caribbean dollar as its unit of currency, as opposed to the pound or the euro. The island's main religions are Catholicism and Voodoo, with several religious festivals featuring in the programme, including the Saint Ursula Festival (in reality, a major festival of the Virgin Islands) and some Voodoo festivals.

Governance
As a British Overseas Territory, Saint Marie's Head of State is the Monarch of the United Kingdom and as such the British government also has responsibility for the island via the Foreign, Commonwealth and Development Office. On the island itself, there is a Governor who represents the monarch and the British government in matters of state. Caroline Bamber served in this role from 2012 until 2016, when she was murdered shortly before she was due to retire from the position. 

Saint-Marie also has its own island government, led by a Prime Minister and supported by a Cabinet of ministers. The full extent of ministerial positions is unknown, though at least one position is a Minister of Commerce, a role held by Jacob Doran until his murder in 2014. The government is headquartered in a building named 'Government House' within Honoré itself. 

Law enforcement on the island is overseen by the Commissioner of the Saint Marie police force, a role held by Selwyn Patterson throughout the duration of the show. Whilst the bulk of the Commissioner's time focuses on the investigations of the Honoré police unit, he also has wider responsibilities across the island, such as in towns like Port Royal. 

Honoré is led by a Mayor and town council, with by-elections being held if a Mayor leaves office before the end of their elected term. Mayor Joseph Richards resigned in 2017 following a corruption scandal, and was replaced by Catherine Bordey in the subsequent by-election.

Locations
The series is filmed on Guadeloupe, and Deshaies doubles for the fictional town of Honoré.

References

Death in Paradise (TV series)
Fictional islands
Fictional countries
Fictional island countries